Q6 can refer to:

 the former on-air branding of KHQ-TV, the NBC affiliate in Spokane, Washington, USA
 the second series of Spike Milligan's Q series, originally aired in 1975
 the IATA airline designator for Aero Condor Peru
 Q6 Trivia Game, run by Microsoft to promote Windows Live Messenger
 The Q6 (New York City bus)
 Nanchang Q-6 (aircraft), a cancelled Chinese derivative of the Mikoyan-Gurevich MiG-23 Soviet military aircraft
 LNER Class Q6, a class of British steam locomotives
 Quran 6,  al-anʿām, the 6th chapter of the Islamic Holy book
 Audi Q6, a sport utility vehicle